The 1958 Segunda División Peruana, the second division of Peruvian football (soccer), was played by 10 teams. The tournament winner, Unión América was promoted to the Primera División Peruana 1959.

Results

Standings

Promotion playoff

External links
 La Historia de la Segunda 1958

 

Peruvian Segunda División seasons
Peru2
2